This Neo-Georgian home was built in 1939 by architect William Lawrence Bottomley for Captain Newton H. White of the United States Navy.

At one time the centerpiece of a  dairy farm, the house and grounds (known locally as the Enterprise Estate) are now entirely surrounded by the Enterprise Golf Course.

Gallery

References
This article contains information from the Maryland National Capital Park and Planning Commission's page on the Newton White Mansion.

External links
 http://www.pgparks.com/places/eleganthistoric/newton_history.html

Houses in Prince George's County, Maryland
Houses completed in 1939